This is a timeline of aviation history, and a list of more detailed aviation timelines. The text in the diagram are clickable links to articles.

Timeline

Timeline of aviation before the 18th century
Timeline of aviation – 18th century
Timeline of aviation – 19th century
Timeline of aviation – 20th century

By decade

1900s: 1900  – 1901 – 1902 – 1903 – 1904 – 1905 – 1906 – 1907 – 1908 – 1909
1910s: 1910 – 1911 – 1912 – 1913 – 1914 – 1915 – 1916 – 1917 – 1918 – 1919
1920s: 1920 – 1921 – 1922 – 1923 – 1924 – 1925 – 1926 – 1927 – 1928 – 1929
1930s: 1930 – 1931 – 1932 – 1933 – 1934 – 1935 – 1936 – 1937 – 1938 – 1939
1940s: 1940 – 1941 – 1942 – 1943 – 1944 – 1945 – 1946 – 1947 – 1948 – 1949
1950s: 1950 – 1951 – 1952 – 1953 – 1954 – 1955 – 1956 – 1957 – 1958 – 1959
1960s: 1960 – 1961 – 1962 – 1963 – 1964 – 1965 – 1966 – 1967 – 1968 – 1969
1970s: 1970 – 1971 – 1972 – 1973 – 1974 – 1975 – 1976 – 1977 – 1978 – 1979
1980s: 1980 – 1981 – 1982 – 1983 – 1984 – 1985 – 1986 – 1987 – 1988 – 1989
1990s: 1990 – 1991 – 1992 – 1993 – 1994 – 1995 – 1996 – 1997 – 1998 – 1999
2000s: 2000 – 2001 – 2002 – 2003 – 2004 – 2005 – 2006 – 2007 – 2008 – 2009
2010s:  2010 – 2011 – 2012 – 2013 – 2014 – 2015 – 2016 – 2017 – 2018 – 2019
2020s:  2020 – 2021 - 2022 - 2023

See also

Aircraft records
Aviation accidents and incidents
Aviation archaeology
Early flying machines
History of aviation
List of firsts in aviation
Timeline of spaceflight
Timeline of transportation technology

 
Aviation
Aviation